The word schema comes from the Greek word , which means shape, or more generally, plan. In English, both schemas and schemata are used as plural forms.

Schema may refer to:

Science and technology
 SCHEMA (bioinformatics), an algorithm used in protein engineering
 Schema (genetic algorithms), a set of programs or bit strings that have some genotypic similarity
 Schema.org, a web markup vocabulary
 Schema (logic)
 Axiom schema, in formal logic
 Image schema, a recurring pattern of spatial sensory experience
 Database schema
 XML schema

Other
 Body schema, a neural representation of one's own bodily posture
 Galant Schemata, stock phrases in Galant music
 Schema (Kant), in philosophy 
 Schema (psychology), a mental set or representation
 Schema Records, a jazz record label in Milan, Italy
, a solemn vow of asceticism of a monk in Orthodox monasticism
 Great Schema, the highest degree of Orthodox monasticism
 Schema (fly), a genus of insects

See also
 Scheme (disambiguation)
 Schematic
 Skema (disambiguation)